Jerdon's minivet (Pericrocotus albifrons) is a species of minivet found in Myanmar, mostly in dry deciduous forest. It is sometimes considered conspecific with the white-bellied minivet.

References

Jerdon's minivet
Birds of Myanmar
Jerdon's minivet